Ruedi Wild (born 3 April 1982) is a Swiss triathlete.

At the 2012 Summer Olympics men's triathlon on Tuesday 7 August, he placed 39th.

References 

1982 births
Living people
Swiss male triathletes
Triathletes at the 2012 Summer Olympics
Olympic triathletes of Switzerland
20th-century Swiss people
21st-century Swiss people